Gerard Dreyfus is an electrical engineer from ESPCI-PARISTECH in Paris, France. He was named a Fellow of the Institute of Electrical and Electronics Engineers (IEEE) in 2012, nominated by its Engineering in Medicine and Biology Society (EMBS) for his contributions to machine learning and its applications.

References

External links

20th-century births
Living people
French engineers
Fellow Members of the IEEE
Year of birth missing (living people)
Place of birth missing (living people)